Gillingham was a constituency represented in the House of Commons of the Parliament of the United Kingdom. It elected one Member of Parliament (MP) by the first past the post system of election.

Boundaries
1918–1950: The Municipal Borough of Gillingham, part of the Municipal Borough of Rochester, and the Municipal Borough of Chatham ward of St Mary.

1950–1983: The Municipal Borough of Gillingham.

1983–1997: The Borough of Gillingham, and the Borough of Swale ward of Hartlip and Upchurch.

1997–2010: The Borough of Gillingham.

The constituency was based around the towns of Gillingham and Rainham, which at that time were in Kent.

Boundary review
Following their review of parliamentary representation in Kent, the Boundary Commission for England abolished Gillingham, replacing it with the renamed constituency of Gillingham and Rainham.

Members of Parliament

Election results

Elections in the 2000s

Elections in the 1990s

Elections in the 1980s

Elections in the 1970s

Elections in the 1960s

Elections in the 1950s

Elections in the 1940s

Elections in the 1930s

Elections in the 1920s

Elections in the 1910s

 Cronin was supported by the Lower Deck Parliamentary Committee

See also
List of parliamentary constituencies in Kent

References

Politics of Medway
Constituencies of the Parliament of the United Kingdom established in 1918
Constituencies of the Parliament of the United Kingdom disestablished in 2010
Parliamentary constituencies in Kent (historic)
Gillingham, Kent